Dapkus is a surname. Notable people with the surname include:

Eleanor Dapkus (1923–2011), American baseball player
Martynas Dapkus (born 1993), Lithuanian footballer